Provanna glabra is a species of sea snail, a marine gastropod mollusk in the family Provannidae.

Description

Distribution
Provanna glabra lives in the Northwest Pacific. The most sightings have been reported in Japan, but it has also been found in Taiwan.

References

glabra
Gastropods described in 1992